Roberts Township may refer to:

 Roberts Township, Jefferson County, Arkansas, in Jefferson County, Arkansas
 Roberts Township, Marshall County, Illinois
 Roberts Township, Wilkin County, Minnesota

Township name disambiguation pages